SN 2012fr was a supernova in the NGC 1365 galaxy that was discovered by Alain Klotz on October 27, 2012.

Discovery 
When Klotz, an astrophysicist from Institut de Recherche en Astrophysique et Planetologie in France checked the galaxy images from TAROT la Silla observatory, the comparison of the night image of the galaxy with a reference image taken one month before clearly revealed the presence of a new star 3"W and 52"N from the nucleus of the galaxy. 

After checking for possible objects like asteroids that might have been in the same location, four individual images that showed the new star were retrieved in the TAROT image archive. Also, the object did not appear in images taken several days before. On October 28th at 6:41 UTC, Emmanuel Conseil sent an email to Alain Klotz indicating he took an image of NGC 1365 using the robotic telescope Slooh robotic telescope. The picture showed the supernova candidate and was seen as the first confirmation.

At 22:00 UTC, Michael Childress from Australian National University took the first spectrum, indicating that it is a type Ia supernova 11 days before the maximum of light. 

On October 31st, 2012 the supernova was given the official designation 2012fr.

Observations 
The TAROT telescope was taking images of the NGC 1365 and NGC 1316 every night from 29th October. The preliminary light curve indicates the supernova becoming bluer before reaching the maximum.

RGB-Magnitude by ARAS ring

External links 
 Light curves and spectra on the Open Supernova Catalog
 Discovery process by Alain Klotz
 Detailed optical and ultraviolet Observations
 AAVSO

References 

20121027
Supernovae
Discoveries by Alain Klotz
Fornax (constellation)